Mikołaj Radziwiłł, nicknamed The Red (Polish Rudy, Lithuanian: Radvila Rudasis), also known as Mikołaj Radziwiłł the Sixth (1512 – 27 April 1584), was a Polish–Lithuanian nobleman, Count Palatine of Vilnius, Grand Chancellor of Lithuania, and Grand Lithuanian Hetman (from 1576) in the Grand Duchy of Lithuania and later in Polish–Lithuanian Commonwealth. Together with his cousin Mikołaj "the Black" Radziwiłł and the Radziwiłł family were granted title and position as Reichsfürst Prince of the Holy Roman Empire.

Mikołaj Radziwiłł spent many years as a military commander. He was not the most famous of Commonwealth hetmans, but under King Stefan Batory, he was fairly successful in defending the eastern borders of the Commonwealth against the Muscovy. One of his most notable victories was achieved during the Battle of Ula of 1564 when his commanded forces defeated Ivan the Terrible's much larger forces.

His political career was marked by his alliance with his cousin Mikołaj 'Black' Radziwiłł with whom he opposed the other notable Lithuanian families in the rivalry for the dominant status in the Great Duchy. The alliance marked the formation of a dynastic-like cooperation between Radziwiłłs and showed how family interests could affect magnates relations with the Commonwealth.

Mikołaj Radziwiłł became an advocate of Lithuanian sovereignty and thus a vocal opponent of political union with Poland, (Union of Lublin, 1569). Unlike the other magnates, he refused to sign the Act as harmful to the interests of the Grand Duchy of Lithuania.

He was one of the most prominent converts and advocates of the Protestant faith in Polish–Lithuanian Commonwealth and his line of the family became devoted members and defenders of the Lithuanian Evangelical Reformed Church until its extinction.

In the Holy Roman Empire, the Trąby Coat of Arms was in the center of a Black Eagle in a golden Shield.

He was immortalized in the epic poem Radivilias (1592).

External links 

Wojciech Kalwat: Mikołaj Radziwiłł (1512-1584) - "Rudy"

References 

1512 births
1584 deaths
Converts to Calvinism from Roman Catholicism
People from Nesvizh
Polish Princes of the Holy Roman Empire
Great Hetmans of the Grand Duchy of Lithuania
Polish Calvinist and Reformed Christians
Lithuanian Calvinist and Reformed Christians
Mikolaj the Red Radziwill
Polish people of the Livonian campaign of Stephen Báthory
Grand Chancellors of the Grand Duchy of Lithuania
Voivode of Vilnius
Voivodes of Trakai